The 1945 Katsuyama killing incident was the murder of three African-American United States Marines in Katsuyama near Nago, Okinawa after the Battle of Okinawa on July 10, 1945 to August 13, 1946. Residents of Katsuyama had reportedly killed the three Marines for their repeated rape of village women during occupation of Okinawa and hid their bodies in a nearby cave out of fear for retaliation. The Katsuyama incident was kept secret until August 16, 1997 when the bodies and identities of the Marines were discovered.

Incident 

In June 1945, Allied victory at the major Battle of Okinawa led to the occupation of the highly-strategic Okinawa Prefecture of Japan shortly before the end of the Pacific War. Reportedly, three African-American soldiers of the United States Marines Corps began to repeatedly visit the village of Katsuyama, northwest of the city of Nago, and every time they violently took the village women into the nearby hills and raped them. The Marines became so confident that the villagers of Katsuyama were powerless to stop them, they came to the village without their weapons.

The villagers took advantage of this and ambushed them with the help of two armed Imperial Japanese Army soldiers who were hiding in the nearby jungle. Shinsei Higa, who was sixteen at the time, remembers that "I didn't see the actual killing because I was hiding in the mountains above, but I heard five or six gunshots and then a lot of footsteps and commotion. By late afternoon, we came down from the mountains and then everyone knew what had happened."

The Marines were killed and, to cover up their deaths, their bodies were dumped  in a local cave which had a 50-foot (15-m) drop-off close to its entrance. In the summer of 1947, when the three Marines did not return to their posts, they were listed as possible deserters. After a year with still no evidence of what happened to them, they were declared missing in action.  Knowledge of the killings subsequently became a village secret for the next 50 years, remaining secret for the duration of the United States Military Government and the United States Civil Administration, until 1972, when the U.S. government returned the islands to Japanese administration.

Discovery 

Kijun Kishimoto, a villager who was almost 30 years old and absent from Katsuyama at the time of the incident, eventually revealed the killings. In an interview, Kishimoto said, "People were very afraid that if the Americans found out what happened there would be retaliation, so they decided to keep it a secret to protect those involved." Finally, a guilty conscience led Kishimoto to contact , a tour guide for Kadena United States Air Base in Okinawa, whose deceased son Clive was also a victim of sexual assault, and who was involved in the search for deceased servicemen from the war.

In June 1997, Kishimoto and Inafuku searched for the cave near Katsuyama, but could not find it until August when a storm blew down a tree which had been blocking the entrance. Kishimoto and Inafuku informed the Japanese police in Okinawa but they kept the discovery a secret for a few months to protect the people who discovered the location of the bodies.

The Katsuyama incident was reported to the United States military by Inafuku, who informed then-Kadena Air Base 18th Wing Historian Master-Sergeant James Allender, who in turn reported it to the Joint Services Central Identification Laboratory at Pearl Harbor. Once the bodies were recovered by the United States Army, the three Marines were identified using dental records as Private First Class James D. Robinson of Savannah, Private First Class John M. Smith of Cincinnati, and Private Isaac Stokes of Chicago, all aged 19 years-old. The cause of death could not be determined.

Aftermath 

No plans were made to criminally investigate the Katsuyama incident by either the United States military or the Okinawa police. Since the killings, locals have allegedly called the cave Kuronbō Gama (黒ん坊がま). In  Okinawa dialect, Gama refers to a cave.  Kuronbō (黒ん坊) is a derogatory and highly offensive word for Black people in Japanese. The Katsuyama incident has been seen by opponents of U.S. military presence in Okinawa as one of many examples of misconduct by American personnel against Okinawans since the islands were first occupied after the Battle of Okinawa in 1945. Steve Rabson, Professor of East Asian Studies at Brown University, estimated that as many as 10,000 such instances of rape occurred after the war. Under the U.S.-Japan Security Treaty, the United States Forces Japan has maintained a large military presence in Okinawa: 27,000 personnel, including 15,000 Marines, contingents from the Army, United States Navy, United States Air Force, and their 22,000 family members.

See also 

 Rape during the occupation of Japan
 1955 Yumiko-chan incident
 1995 Okinawa rape incident
 2002 Okinawa Michael Brown assault incident
 Sexual assault in the U.S. military

Notes

References

Further reading 

 
 
 

1945 crimes in Japan
Caves of Japan
Murder in Japan
Mass murder in 1945
Japan–United States relations
Politics of Japan
United States military in Japan
Occupied Japan
Wartime sexual violence in World War II
United States Marine Corps in the 20th century
United States Armed Forces in Okinawa Prefecture
Rape in Japan
1945 murders in Japan
United States war crimes
War crimes in Japan